The British Olympic Association (BOA) is the National Olympic Committee for the United Kingdom.  It is responsible for organising and overseeing the participation of athletes from the Great Britain and Northern Ireland Olympic Team, at both the summer and winter Olympic Games, the Youth Olympic Games, the European Youth Olympic Festivals, and at the European Games.

BOA members and sporting bodies
The British Olympic Association – of the United Kingdom, its constituent countries,  the Crown Dependencies and British Overseas Territories which do not have their own NOC – competes at all summer, winter and youth Olympics as  Great Britain ("Team GB").

Members
The association comprises members from the following –

 

Note – Northern Irish athletes can choose whether to compete for Great Britain or for the Republic of Ireland, as they are entitled to citizenship of either nation under the Good Friday Agreement.

Crown Dependencies:

British Overseas Territories:

 

Note – IOC rules currently do not allow dependent territories to obtain recognition for National Olympic Committees (NOCs). Three British Overseas Territories have their own NOCs predating this rule and are therefore not connected with the BOA: Bermuda, the British Virgin Islands and the Cayman Islands. While the territories of British Antarctic Territory, British Indian Ocean Territory and South Georgia and the South Sandwich Islands are nominally represented by the BOA, these territories have no permanent population and do not send athletes.

British sports bodies associated with the BOA 
 UK Sport
 UK Anti-Doping 
 Sport England
 English Institute of Sport
 Sport Northern Ireland
 Sportscotland
 Sport Wales

Role
The BOA is one of 206 National Committees (NOCs) currently recognised by the International Olympic Committee (IOC). The IOC leads the promotion of Olympism in accordance with the Olympic Charter.

Working with the national governing bodies of each sport, the BOA selects Team GB's members to compete in all sports at the summer and winter Olympics.
The BOA is independent and receives no funding from the government. Its income comes from fundraising and events.

The Great Britain is one of only five National Olympic Committees (the others being Australia, France, Greece and Switzerland) which have never failed to be represented at the Summer Olympic Games since 1896. Of these countries Great Britain, France and Switzerland are the only countries to have been present at all Olympic Winter Games; thus Great Britain is one of three countries that have competed at all Olympic Games. Great Britain is also the only nation in the Olympic Games to have won a Gold in every Summer games. Great Britain has hosted three Olympic Games, all of them in London: in 1908, 1948 and 2012.

Structure
At its formation in 1905 the association consisted of seven national governing body members from the following sports: fencing, life-saving, cycling, skating, rowing, athletics, rugby football, association football, and archery.  It now includes as its members the thirty-three national governing bodies of each Olympic sport, both summer and winter.

A representative of each of the Olympic sports makes up the NOC, the BOA's decision and policy-making body. The NOC elects three officers: a President, a Chairman, and a Vice-Chairman, each for a four-year term. Six members of the NOC are elected to the Board, which oversees the work of the BOA and puts forward proposals for decision by the NOC. The present (2022) chief office holders are:

 President: The Princess Royal
 Chairman: Sir Hugh Robertson

 CEO: Andy Anson

 Vice Chairman: Annamarie Phelps

Former Chairmen
 Arthur Gold (1984 to 1992)

Founding
The BOA's origins pre-date the International Olympic movement and its governing body, the International Olympic Committee.

It traces its roots back to the National Olympian Association (NOA), which held its inaugural meeting at the Liverpool Gymnasium, Myrtle Street, Liverpool in November 1865. It promoted an annual series of sporting events across Britain, with the aim of encouraging participation in physical education through Olympian festivals.
The NOA came about mainly through the efforts of John Hulley of Liverpool (Chairman), Dr William Penny Brookes (of Much Wenlock) and E G Ravenstein (president of the German Gymnastic Society of London).
It took the existing Olympian Games of Much Wenlock as its example, thus the NOA Games "were open to all comers" and not just the products of Britain's public schools.

After the NOA closed in 1883 its motto ('Civium virtus civitatis tutamen' meaning 'the power of the citizens is the defence of the state') and ethos were inherited by the National Physical Recreation Society (NPRS) which was founded in 1885. From 1902 the President and Treasurer of the NPRS were members of the Olympic "Comité Britannique" and the NPRS was a founding body of the British Olympic Association in 1905.

Arms

See also
Great Britain at the Olympics
British Paralympic Association
Campaign for a Scottish Olympic Team
Commonwealth Games England
Commonwealth Games Scotland
Commonwealth Games Wales
Northern Ireland Commonwealth Games Council

Further reading
 Llewellyn, Matthew P (2012). Rule Britannia: Nationalism, Identity and the Modern Olympic Games. Routledge.

References

External links
Team GB: official website
British Olympic Association Archive Collection

1905 establishments in the United Kingdom
 
National Olympic Committees
Olympics
Sports organizations established in 1905